Mezhür Higher Secondary School is a private school in Kohima, Nagaland, India providing both High school and Higher secondary school education. The school was previously known as Kohima English School.

History 
The School was founded on 18 August 1958 by Samuel Mezhür Sekhose. Initially named as Little Flower School, the school was renamed in 1962 as Kohima English School. 

In 1998, the Nagaland Government introduced a regulation that the word ENGLISH be removed from the names of all the schools in the state and thus the present name was given in memory of its founder.

Campus 
Mezhür Higher Secondary School is located at Midland Ward, Kohima, Nagaland. The campus is spread over three acres. The school is composed of 5 building blocks consisting of 67 rooms.
There are 2 basketball courts, table tennis court, 2 computer labs, Science Laboratory, 3 auditoriums and a school canteen.

Extra-curricular activities 
 Annual Sports' Meet
 Annual School Fete
 Banuo Memorial Inter-School Basketball Tournament
 Traditional cum Cultural Day
 Flower Exhibition
 Teacher's Day Celebration
 Fresher's cum Farewell Functions
 Fancy Dress Competition
 Youth Parliament Competition
 Quiz Competition
 Parent's Day
 Children's Day
 Singing Competition

Notable alumni 

 Neidonuo Angami (b. 1950), social activist

See also 
 List of higher education and academic institutions in Kohima
 List of schools in Nagaland

References

External links

Official sites 
 Mezhür Higher Secondary School Official Website

Education in Kohima
Education in Nagaland
High schools and secondary schools in Nagaland
Private schools in Nagaland
Kohima district
Educational institutions established in 1958
1958 establishments in Assam